The Palm Line was a UK-owned shipping line that was engaged in the West African trade from 1949, primarily servicing the ports along 5,000 miles of coastline from Morocco in the north to Angola in the far south. It ceased trading in 1986.

Palm Line was a member of both UK/West Africa Lines Joint Service (UKWAL) and Continent/West Africa Conference (COWAC) together with Elder Dempster, Black Star Line, Nigerian National Shipping Line, Guinea Gulf Line and Norwegian Hoegh Line.

Background

In the post-war period of the late 1940s, UAC decided to divest its shipping fleet to become an independent company in its own right. On 16 February 1949, an extraordinary general meeting of shareholders was held to set up the new company. This was done by reviving the dormant articles of association of the old Southern Whaling and Sealing Company, which Lever Bros. had bought in 1919 then sold to Christian Salvesen Ltd in 1941, and changing the name to Palm Line.

The name of the new company had not been decided upon without considerable discussion. At one stage the name Sun Line had been put forward. It was Mr Frank Samuel, later to become the new company's first chairman who thought of the name 'Palm'.

The Creeks
Draught is another important feature. The coast of West Africa is extremely flat, and the slow-moving rivers and tidal currents have combined to build up long sand bars a mile or two off the coast. To enter most of the rivers, ships must pass over these bars;  being the maximum draught to serve all ports.

Krooboys
It was common practice for all vessels to call in at Freetown both south- and northbound to take on both fuel bunkers and 'Krooboys' - additional local West African crew members; their duties being mainly chipping, painting and hold cleaning. They had their own separate accommodation on deck between hatches 1 & 2, with the headman having his own cabin in the fo'c'sle.

The End
The early 1980s spelled the beginning of the end for Palm Line. From 1982 until 1986 the dramatic drop in Europe / West Africa trade meant the increasing need to charter the vessels out to third parties. Palm Line was sold to Ocean Fleets in 1986. The last Chairman of Palm Lines was Gordon Williams of Pontypool.

Emblem
The palm tree emblem had already been used on a Unilever Ltd house flag designed in 1939.

Merseyside Maritime Museum
From Jun-Dec 2018 the museum had a temporary exhibition entitled 'Palm Line - A new company for a new era', with a scale-model of MV Matadi Palm (1970) as its centrepiece.

The Fleet

Bibliography

References

External links

1911 establishments in England
1986 disestablishments in England
Defunct shipping companies of the United Kingdom
Palm oil
Former Unilever companies
British companies established in 1969
British companies disestablished in 1986
Transport companies established in 1969
Transport companies disestablished in 1986